Aikanã (sometimes called Tubarão, Corumbiara/Kolumbiara, or Huari/Uari/Wari) is an endangered language isolate spoken by about 200 Aikanã people in Rondônia, Brazil. It is morphologically complex and has SOV word order. Aikanã uses the Latin script. The people live with speakers of Koaia (Kwaza).

Classification
Van der Voort (2005) observes similarities among Aikanã, Kanoê, and Kwaza, but believes the evidence is not strong enough to definitively link the three languages together as part of a single language family. Hence, Aikanã is best considered to be a language isolate. An automated computational analysis (ASJP 4) by Müller et al. (2013) also found lexical similarities between Aikanã and Kwaza. However, since the analysis was automatically generated, the grouping could be either due to mutual lexical borrowing or genetic inheritance.

Jolkesky (2016) also notes that there are lexical similarities with Kanoe, Kwaza, and Nambikwara due to contact.

Varieties
Varieties listed by Loukotka (1968):
Huari (Corumbiara) - spoken between the Corumbiara River and Guarajú River, Rondônia
Masaca (Aicana) - spoken on the left bank of the Corumbiara River
Aboba - extinct language once spoken on the Guarajú River
Maba - extinct language once spoken on the Guajejú River (unattested)
Puxacaze - once spoken on the Guajejú River, Brazil (unattested)
Guajejú - once spoken at the sources of the Jamarí River and Candeia River (unattested)

Phonology

Vowels 

 /y, ỹ/ can also be heard as close-mid [ø, ø̃].
 /a, ã/ are heard as [ɨ, ɨ̃] before /i, ĩ/.

Consonants 

 Within the position of nasal vowels, sounds /b, d, d͡ð/ become [m, n, ⁿ̪ð] and /w, ɾ, h/ become [w̃, ɾ̃, h̃].
 /t̪͡s, d͡ð/ are only heard as affricates [t̪͡s, d͡ð] in word-initial position. Elsewhere, they are heard as a fricatives [s] and [ð].
 /w/ can be heard as a fricative [β] when before /i/.
 /ɾ/ can also be heard as [l] between vowels.
 /d͡ʒ/ is heard as [d͡ʒ] before a front-vowel, [j] before a non-front vowel, and as [ɲ] or [j̃] before a nasal vowel.

Vocabulary
Loukotka (1968) lists the following basic vocabulary items for Huari and Masaca, as well as Capixana.

{| class="wikitable sortable"
! gloss !! Huari !! Masaca !! Capixana
|-
! one
| amemeeː || amäme || pátairä
|-
! two
| arukai || atuka || kãerá
|-
! three
|  || ümaitü || piakaúkä
|-
! head
| chimé || tinupá || i-kutá
|-
! ear
| ka-niyú || ka-nĩgó || i-tẽyõ
|-
! tooth
| múi || mõiː || i-pé
|-
! hand
| iné || iné || i-so
|-
! woman
| chikichíki || dätiá || míaʔä
|-
! water
| hané || hánä || kuni
|-
! fire
| íne || íné || iní
|-
! stone
| huahuá || urorä || akí
|-
! maize
| atití || ákí || atití
|-
! tapir
| arimé || alümä || itsá
|}

Aikanã plant and animal names from Silva (2012) are listed in the corresponding Portuguese article.

Further reading
Vasconcelos, I. P. (2004). Aspectos da fonologia e morfologia da língua Aikanã. Maceió: Universidade Federal de Alagoas. (Masters dissertation).

References 

Alain Fabre, 2005, Diccionario etnolingüístico y guía bibliográfica de los pueblos indígenas sudamericanos: AIKANA

Indigenous languages of Western Amazonia
Languages of Brazil
Language isolates of South America
Endangered language isolates
Subject–object–verb languages
Mamoré–Guaporé linguistic area